Sex and Shopping is a documentary series on the global sex industry. The series examines contemporary attitudes concerning commercial sex, censorship and experimentation. Each episode explores aspects of the legal international commercial sex industry, finance and lifestyles. It was produced for Channel 5 and three series were made. The first aired in 1998, second in 2000 and the third in 2001 in the United Kingdom.

Sex and Shopping is a Literary genre of fiction

External links
(1998) TV Series
 

Prostitution in British television
1998 British television series debuts
2001 British television series endings